The 2006 Costa Rica local elections were held on December 3, 2006. In the February 2006 general elections, Costa Rica elected president, vice-presidents, deputies of the Legislative Assembly and municipal councilors in the general elections. The December 2006 elections were held to elect cantonal mayors, members of the District Councils of each of the nation’s districts and intendants of eight special autonomous districts and islands.

The ruling National Liberation Party won most of the seats and mayors with 59 as the seven provincial capitals. The main opposition party, Citizens' Action Party, was unsuccessful in keep the support it had in the presidential election. In the February 2006 elections, this party had almost tied the PLN. The Social Christian Unity Party become the second largest force at municipal level. Libertarian Movement  achieved it first ever municipal government. Additionally, three local parties were successful in Curridabat, Aguirre and Siquirres.

Results

Mayor

By province

Municipal councils, syndics, district councils

See also 
 Local government in Costa Rica
 List of mayors in Costa Rica

References

2006 elections in Central America
2006 in Costa Rica
Local elections in Costa Rica